Bont F.C. are a Welsh football club based at Pontrhydfendigaid, a small village in Ceredigion, Wales. They currently play in the Aberystwyth League, where they are one of the league's most successful clubs.

History
The club is officially called Pontrhydfendigaid & District Football Club but are universally known as Bont. The club played its first competitive match in 1947, entering the Second Division of the Aberystwyth League. They were winners of this league at their first attempt.

Honours

Aberystwyth League Division One – Champions (7): 1947–48; 1964–65; 1966–67; 1969–70; 1970–71; 2009–10; 2016–17
Aberystwyth League Division One – Runners-up: 2021–22

External links
Official club Twitter

References

Football clubs in Wales
Sport in Ceredigion
Association football clubs established in 1947
1947 establishments in Wales
Aberystwyth League clubs